Marius Delaby (13 June 1890 – 1973) was a French sprinter. He competed in the men's 100 metres at the 1912 Summer Olympics.

References

External links
 

1890 births
1973 deaths
Athletes (track and field) at the 1912 Summer Olympics
French male sprinters
French male high jumpers
Olympic athletes of France
Place of birth missing